Sara Parise (born 9 January 1982, in Bolzano) is a freestyle swimmer from Italy who won two silver medals as a member of the relay teams at the 2002 European Championships. She represented her native country at two consecutive Summer Olympics, starting in 2000.

References

External links
 Profile

1982 births
Living people
Italian female swimmers
Swimmers at the 2000 Summer Olympics
Swimmers at the 2004 Summer Olympics
Olympic swimmers of Italy
Sportspeople from Bolzano
European Aquatics Championships medalists in swimming
20th-century Italian women
21st-century Italian women